Hyphalus wisei is a species of intertidal beetle endemic to New Zealand.

Description 
The adult beetle is 1.1 - 1.2 mm long and has a black body with pale coloured setae that give the insect a grey appearance. The larvae of this beetle are 2 mm long and are coloured pale to dark brown. Both the adult beetle and its larva are very similar in appearance to the species Hyphalus insularis.

Distribution 
This species has been found in Rodney County near Te Hāwere-a-Maki / Goat Island. This species has also been found on Cuvier Island.

References

External links 

 New Zealand Organisms Register entry for Hyphalus wisei

Beetles of New Zealand
Beetles described in 1973
Endemic fauna of New Zealand
Endemic insects of New Zealand